Sir John Dermot Turing, 12th Baronet (born 26 February 1961) is a British solicitor and author.

Education
Turing was educated at Sherborne School and King's College, Cambridge. He then undertook a DPhil degree in genetics of the fruit fly as a postgraduate student of New College, Oxford.

Career
After his DPhil, Turing moved into the legal profession initially as an HM Treasury solicitor. He then worked at the international law firm Clifford Chance, where he was a partner until 2014 and latterly a consultant. He specialized in the financial sector, especially with respect to failed banks, regulation, and risk management.

In 2012, the centenary year of his uncle Alan Turing's birth, Dermot Turing became a trustee of Bletchley Park, where Alan Turing worked as a cryptologist during World War II. In 2015 he wrote a book on Alan Turing, Prof: Alan Turing Decoded, and in 2017 he contributed a chapter to The Turing Guide. He is a member of the European Post-Trade Forum and a trustee of the Turing Trust. His interests also include cryptanalysis and naval history.

Dermot Turing has commented on the accuracy of the 2014 film The Imitation Game, a dramatization of Alan Turing's life. In 2018 he published X, Y & Z: The Real Story of How Enigma Was Broken.

Awards and honours
In 2020, he was awarded the Knight's Cross of the Order of Merit of the Republic of Poland for highlighting the role of the Polish in breaking the Enigma code. He is a visiting fellow at Kellogg College, Oxford.

Personal life
Turing is the nephew of Alan Turing and the 12th Baronet in the Turing baronetcy. He is the son of John Ferrier Turing and Beryl Mary Ada Turing née Hann. In 1986, he married Nicola Jane Simmonds, daughter of Malcolm Douglas Simmonds. In 1987, he succeeded his third cousin as the 12th Turing Baronet. He has two sons: John Malcolm Ferrier, his heir apparent (born 1988) and James Robert Edward (born 1991)

References

1961 births
Living people
People educated at Sherborne School
Alumni of King's College, Cambridge
Alumni of New College, Oxford
20th-century English lawyers
21st-century English lawyers
English biographers
Baronets in the Baronetage of Nova Scotia
Alan Turing
Knights of the Order of Merit of the Republic of Poland